Nate Englin (born April 24, 1986) is an American shot putter from Shoreview, Minnesota, throwing for the Missouri Tigers.

International
Following Englin's freshman season at Missouri, he competed in the 2005 Pan-American Games (Junior) and the USA Track and Field junior games. He earned a silver medal in each competition.

College
As a sophomore in 2006, Englin qualified for the NCAA Championships in the shot put and was named all-Big 12 in outdoor shot put and weight throw (indoor). His best throw came at a meet in Los Angeles in the shot put, when he tossed 62 feet (18.90m). As a freshman in 2005, Englin earned two all-Big 12 honors, both in shot put (indoor and outdoor).

High school
He competed for Mounds View Track and Field and set the Minnesota state record in the shot put, 65–6 feet, as a junior in 2003; the record stood until 2012.

Personal bests
INDOOR
 Shot Put: 18.19m, 59-8¼, CMSU Open '06
 Weight Throw: 19.82m, 65-½, Big 12 Indoor '06
OUTDOOR
 Shot Put: 18.90m, 62-¼, UCLA Invite '06
 Discus: 50.66m, 166–2, Arizona St Invite '06
 Hammer Throw: 55.27m, 181–4, Big 12 '06

References

 Englin's official bio from University of Missouri

American male shot putters
Living people
University of Missouri alumni
1987 births